Hsp33 protein is a molecular chaperone, distinguished from all other known chaperones by its mode of functional regulation. Its activity is redox regulated. Hsp33 is a cytoplasmically localized protein with highly reactive cysteines that respond quickly to changes in the redox environment. Oxidizing conditions like H2O2 cause disulphide bonds to form in Hsp33, a process that leads to the activation of its chaperone function.

References

Heat shock proteins
Molecular chaperones